Bağbanlar (known as Arxangelovka until 1991) is a village and municipality in the Bilasuvar District of Azerbaijan. It has a population of 3,739.

References 

Populated places in Bilasuvar District